This is a list of artists who have contributed art to the game of Magic: The Gathering. While 25 artists contributed art to the original Alpha Magic set, 418 different artists illustrated Magic cards through Shards of Alara. Ron Spencer, Mark Tedin, and Pete Venters were the final original artists from Alpha to be active (each had their most recent new piece in Magic 2011). Spencer is also among the seven artists that have contributed more than 200 pieces for Magic, notable others being Greg Staples, Pete Venters, and Kev Walker. , Walker is the most-featured artist, with 436 cards featuring his art as of the Double Masters set.

The list refers to the earliest printing of a given piece of art.

Split cards with both sides by the same artist count as 2 separate pieces. 

# = Number of artworks of the artist used for Magic cards (as found at Gatherer); First = Year and set of first artwork in Magic; Last = Year and set of most recent new artwork in Magic.

Further reading

External links 
 The Gatherer: Information about all cards including artists
 Links to Artist Websites as of 2006

Magic: The Gathering
artists